Irreligion in the United Arab Emirates is rare, with only up to 4% of people reporting irreligious beliefs according to a Gallup poll. It is illegal for Muslims, with apostates from Islam facing a maximum sentence of the death penalty under the country's anti-blasphemy law. As such, there have been questions regarding freedom of religion in the United Arab Emirates.

Atheism in the region is mainly present among foreign expatriates and a very small number of local youth. According to Sultan Sooud Al-Qassemi, due to Islam being founded in the Arabian Peninsula over 1,400 years ago, the Persian Gulf region enjoys a long Islamic history and tradition, and it is strongly associated with national identity; thus, any distancing or criticism of religion "equates to distancing oneself from national identity". Al-Qassemi notes that the use of social media via the internet remains the strongest medium of expression for Gulf atheists, while providing anonymity; a pioneering Gulf blogger is the Emirati atheist Ahmed Ben Kerishan, who is known in the Arabic blogosphere for advocating atheist and secular views.

See also
 Persecution of atheists in Islamic countries
 Persecution of atheists in the Middle East
 Religion in the United Arab Emirates
 Freedom of religion in the United Arab Emirates
 Christianity in the United Arab Emirates
 Islam in the United Arab Emirates
 Demographics of the United Arab Emirates

References

Irreligion by country
Irreligion in the Middle East
Irreligion in the Arab world